Robert Watts (born 1938) is a British film producer.

Robert Watts may also refer to:

 Robert Watts (minister) (1820–1895), Irish Presbyterian minister
 Robert Watts (artist) (1923–1988), American artist
 Robert Watts (priest) (fl. 1740), Irish priest
 Robert Nugent Watts (died 1867), political figure in Canada East

See also
 Robert Watt (disambiguation)